Takhtamukaysky District is an administrative and a municipal district (raion), one of the seven in the Republic of Adygea, Russia. It is located in the west of the republic and borders with Krasnoarmeysky District of Krasnodar Krai and with the territory of the City of Krasnodar in the north, Teuchezhsky District in the east, the territory of the Town of Goryachy Klyuch of Krasnodar Krai in the south, and with Seversky District of Krasnodar Krai in the south and west. Its administrative center is the rural locality (an aul) of Takhtamukay. As of the 2010 Census, the total population of the district was 69,662, with the population of Takhtamukay accounting for 7.5% of that number.

History
The district was first established on September 2, 1924, but was abolished a few years later on February 7, 1929. On December 31, 1934, the district was re-established and existed until February 1, 1963, when it was merged into Teuchezhsky Rural District. The district was again re-established, in its modern form, on April 25, 1983, under the name of Oktyabrsky. It was renamed Takhtamukaysky in 1990.

Administrative and municipal status
Within the framework of administrative divisions, Takhtamukaysky District is one of the seven in the Republic of Adygea and has administrative jurisdiction over two urban-type settlements and twenty-five rural localities. As a municipal division, the district is incorporated as Takhtamukaysky Municipal District. The two urban-type settlements and six rural localities are incorporated into two urban settlements, while the remaining nineteen rural localities are incorporated into five rural settlements within the municipal district. The aul of Takhtamukay serves as the administrative center of both the administrative and municipal district.

Municipal composition
Urban settlements
Enemskoye Urban Settlement
urban-type settlement of Enem
rural localities under jurisdiction of the urban-type settlement:
settlement of Druzhny
aul of Novobzhegokay
khutor of Novy Sad
khutor of Supovsky
Yablonovskoye Urban Settlement
urban-type settlement of Yablonovsky
rural localities under jurisdiction of the urban-type settlement:
settlement of Novy
settlement of Perekatny

Rural settlements
Afipsipskoye Rural Settlement
Administrative center: aul of Afipsip
other localities of the rural settlement:
aul of Khashtuk
settlement of Kubanstroy
aul of Panakhes
aul of Pseytuk
Kozetskoye Rural Settlement
Administrative center: aul of Kozet
Shendzhiyskoye Rural Settlement
Administrative center: aul of Shendzhy
other localities of the rural settlement:
khutor of Krasnoarmeysky
khutor of Novomogilyovsky
khutor of Staromogilyovsky
Starobzhegokayskoye Rural Settlement
Administrative center: aul of Starobzhegokay
other localities of the rural settlement:
khutor of Khomuty
settlement of Novaya Adygea
Takhtamukayskoye Rural Settlement
Administrative center: aul of Takhtamukay
other localities of the rural settlement:
khutor of Apostolidi
aul of Natukhay
settlement of Otradny
settlement of Prikubansky
settlement of Sups

References

Notes

Sources

Districts of Adygea
 
States and territories established in 1924
States and territories disestablished in 1929
States and territories established in 1934
States and territories disestablished in 1963
States and territories established in 1983
1924 establishments in the Soviet Union